James Connolly (1868–1916) was an Irish socialist leader.

James Connolly may also refer to:

 James Connolly (athlete born 1900) (1900–1940), American athlete in the 1920 and 1924 Olympics
 James Connolly (Australian politician) (1869–1962), Australian politician
 James Connolly (rugby union) (born 1993), Irish rugby union player
 James Connolly (stonemason) (died 1852), Irish stonemason and builder of Adare Manor
 James A. Connolly (1843–1914), United States Representative from Illinois
 James Bell Connolly (1892–1970), Australian politician
 James Brendan Connolly (1868–1957), American athlete in the 1896 and 1900 Olympics, and later author
 James J. Connolly (1881–1952), United States Representative from Pennsylvania
 James L. Connolly (1909–1982), Canadian politician
 James Louis Connolly (1894–1986), American prelate of the Roman Catholic Church
 James P. Connolly, American comedian and TV/radio host 
 Jimmy Connolly (footballer), Ireland footballer
 Jim Connolly (illustrator) (born 1978), British artist
 James Connolly (footballer), Welsh footballer

See also 
 Connolly (surname)
 James Connelly (disambiguation)